The SOWEGA Building or Southwest Georgia Melon Growers Association Building (also known as The Watermelon Building) in Adel, Georgia at 100 South Hutchinson Avenue (US 41), at the corner with Fourth Street.  (SOWEGA comes from SOuth WEst GeorgiA - and "GA" is the abbreviation for "Georgia".) It was built in 1930.  It is three stories tall and made of red brick, built in a commercial style.  It has a roof deck and a basement.  It is made of concrete reinforced with steel.  Terracotta trim accents the exterior.  The base is finished in marble.  It features unique green terracotta watermelons in terracotta lozenges  in a broad diamond, which represent the SOWEGA trademark.  The third floor was remodeled in the early 1960s and the ground floor was remodeled in 1988.  It was listed on the National Register of Historic Places in 1990.  The Adel-Cook County Chamber of Commerce currently uses the building.

It was designed by Atlanta architects Daniell & Beutell.

Photos

References

External links
 

Commercial buildings on the National Register of Historic Places in Georgia (U.S. state)
Buildings and structures completed in 1930
Buildings and structures in Cook County, Georgia
National Register of Historic Places in Cook County, Georgia
Cook County, Georgia